Jasper County Airport  is located one mile northwest of Rensselaer, in Jasper County, Indiana, United States.

Most U.S. airports use the same three-letter location identifier for the FAA and IATA, but this airport is RZL to the FAA and RNZ to the IATA.

Facilities
It has two runways: 18/36 is 4,000 by 60 feet (1,220 x 18 m) concrete; 9/27 is 1,450 by 150 feet (442 x 46 m) turf.

In 2006 the airport had 8,407 aircraft operations, an average of 23 per day: 98% general aviation and 2% air taxi. In November 2016, there were 18 aircraft based at this airport: 16 single-engine, 1 multi-engine and 1 helicopter.

References

External links 
 Aerial photo from Indiana DOT
 Aerial photo as of 11 April 1998 from USGS The National Map
 
 

Airports in Indiana
Transportation buildings and structures in Jasper County, Indiana